

Georg Lassen (12 May 1915 – 18 January 2012) was a German U-boat commander during World War II.

Whist aboard the U-29 under the command of Kapitänleutnant Otto Schuhart the crew sunk a total of 12 ships, including the British aircraft carrier HMS Courageous. Lassen became commander of U-29 on 3 January 1941 when Otto Schuhart was reassigned as a training instructor. The U-29 was under Lassen's command until from 3 January 1941 to 14 September 1941 during which the submarine was a training boat attached to the 24th (Training) Flotilla.

After his stint aboard the U-29, he was assigned command of U-160. On his first patrol with the crew of U-160 they sank and damaged a total of 6 vessels during the time between March and April 1942. A year later aboard U-160 during a patrol in South African waters Lassen and his crew sank and/or damaged 6 ships in under 5 hours. Lassen received the Oak Leaves for his Iron Cross for his success during the South African patrol.

In June 1943, Lassen was reassigned as a tactics instructor with the 1. U-Boot Lehrdivision, the same training division his former commander Otto Schuhart was reassigned to earlier.

Lassen became a businessman after the war and later worked as a managing director for a large company. In a traffic accident he lost an arm. His wife died after 55 years of marriage. In old age he moved to a retirement home in Mallorca, where he died on 18 January 2012 at the age of 96.

Awards

Wehrmacht Long Service Award 4th Class (5 April 1939)
Iron Cross (1939) 2nd Class (26 September 1939)  & 1st Class (18 July 1940)
 Memel Medal (26 October 1939)
 U-boat War Badge (1939) (18 July 1940)
 U-boat Front Clasp (22 October 1944)
 Knight's Cross of the Iron Cross with Oak Leaves
 Knight's Cross on 10 August 1942 as Oberleutnant zur See and commander of U-160
 Oak Leaves on 7 March 1943 as Kapitänleutnant and commander of U-160

References

Citations

Bibliography

 
 

1915 births
2012 deaths
U-boat commanders (Kriegsmarine)
Military personnel from Berlin
People from the Province of Brandenburg
Recipients of the Knight's Cross of the Iron Cross with Oak Leaves
German amputees